Robbie Collin is a British film critic.

Collin studied aesthetics and the philosophy of film at the University of St Andrews, Scotland. He edited the university's student newspaper, The Saint.

Collin has been the chief film critic at The Daily Telegraph since 2011. From 2007 to 2011 he wrote a weekly film column for the News of the World until the newspaper's closure. That year he was shortlisted for Critic of the Year at the British Press Awards, and was shortlisted again in 2017, when he was highly commended by the jury.

He appeared on the Channel 4 Vue Film Show, presented by Edith Bowman, and contributed to the BBC Radio 2 Arts Show with Claudia Winkleman. In August 2013 he guest presented BBC Radio 4's Film programme. He guest-presents Kermode and Mayo's Film Review, also with Edith Bowman, Sanjeev Bhaskar and Ben Bailey Smith.

In 2018 Collin compiled a list of the 100 greatest films of all time for the Telegraph, with Singin' in the Rain at the top.

References

External links
 The Telegraph journalist page for Robbie Collin, with links to recent reviews and articles
 Robbie Collin's Twitter page
 Robbie Collin's 100 Greatest Films of All Time

Alumni of the University of St Andrews
British film critics
The Daily Telegraph people
Living people
Year of birth missing (living people)